Platycerium veitchii, called the silver elkhorn fern or the silver staghorn fern, is a species of fern in the family Polypodiaceae, native to Queensland. It has gained the Royal Horticultural Society's Award of Garden Merit as an ornamental.

References

veitchii
Flora of Queensland
Ferns of Australia
Plants described in 1906